In mathematics, Fourier–Bessel series is a particular kind of generalized Fourier series (an infinite series expansion on a finite interval) based on Bessel functions.

Fourier–Bessel series are used in the solution to partial differential equations, particularly in cylindrical coordinate systems.

Definition 

The Fourier–Bessel series of a function  with a domain of  satisfying 

is the representation of that function as a linear combination of many orthogonal versions of the same Bessel function of the first kind Jα, where the argument to each version n is differently scaled, according to 

where uα,n is a root, numbered n associated with the Bessel function Jα and cn are the assigned coefficients:

Interpretation 

The Fourier–Bessel series may be thought of as a Fourier expansion in the ρ coordinate of cylindrical coordinates. Just as the Fourier series is defined for a finite interval and has a counterpart, the continuous Fourier transform over an infinite interval, so the Fourier–Bessel series has a counterpart over an infinite interval, namely the Hankel transform.

Calculating the coefficients 

As said, differently scaled Bessel Functions are orthogonal with respect to the inner product

according to

(where:  is the Kronecker delta). The coefficients can be obtained from projecting the function  onto the respective Bessel functions:

where the plus or minus sign is equally valid.

For the inverse transform, one makes use of the following representation of the Dirac delta function

One-to-one relation between order index (n) and continuous frequency 

Fourier–Bessel series coefficients are unique for a given signal, and there is one-to-one mapping between continuous frequency and order index  which can be expressed as follows:

Since, . So above equation can be rewritten as follows:

2-D- Fourier-Bessel series expansion 
For an image   of size M×N, the synthesis equations for order-0 2D-Fourier–Bessel series expansion is as follows:

Where  is 2D-Fourier–Bessel series expansion coefficients whose mathematical expressions are as follows:

where,

Fourier-Bessel series expansion based entropies 
For a signal of length , Fourier-Bessel based spectral entropy such as Shannon spectral entropy, log energy entropy, and Wiener entropy are defined as follows:

where  is the normalized energy distribution which is mathematically defined as follows:

 is energy spectrum which is mathematically defined as follows:

Fourier Bessel Series Expansion based Empirical Wavelet Transform 
The Empirical wavelet transform (EWT) is a multi-scale signal processing approach for the decomposition of multi-component signal into intrinsic mode functions (IMFs). The EWT is based on the design of empirical wavelet based filter bank based on the segregation of Fourier spectrum of the multi-component signals. The segregation of Fourier spectrum of multi-component signal is performed using the detection of peaks and then the evaluation of boundary points. For non-stationary signals, the Fourier Bessel Series Expansion (FBSE) is the natural choice as it uses Bessel function as basis for analysis and synthesis of the signal. The FBSE spectrum has produced the number of frequency bins same as the length of the signal in the frequency range [0, ]. Therefore, in FBSE-EWT, the boundary points are detected using the FBSE based spectrum of the non-stationary signal. Once, the boundary points are obtained, the empirical wavelet based filter-bank is designed in the Fourier domain  of the multi-component signal to evaluate IMFs. The FBSE based method used in FBSE-EWT has produced higher number of boundary points as compared to FFT part in EWT based method. The features extracted from the IMFs of EEG and ECG signals obtained using FBSE-EWT based approach have shown better performance for the automated detection of Neurological and cardiac ailments.

Fourier-Bessel Series Expansion Domain Discrete Stockwell Transform 
For a discrete time signal, x(n), the FBSE domain discrete Stockwell transform (FBSE-DST) is evaluated as follows:where Y(l) are the FBSE coefficients and these coefficients are calculated using the following expression as

The is termed as the  root of the Bessel function, and it is evaluated in an iterative manner based on the solution of using the Newton-Rapson method. Similarly, the g(m,l) is the FBSE domain Gaussian window and it is given as follows :

Fourier–Bessel expansion-based discrete energy separation algorithm
For multicomponent amplitude and frequency modulated (AM-FM) signals, the discrete energy separation algorithm (DESA) together with the Gabor's filtering is a traditional approach to estimate the amplitude envelope (AE) and the instantaneous frequency (IF) functions. It has been observed that the filtering operation distorts the amplitude and phase modulations in the separated monocomponent signals.

Advantages
The Fourier–Bessel series expansion does not require use of window function in order to obtain spectrum of the signal. It represents real signal in terms of real Bessel basis functions. It provides representation of real signals it terms of positive frequencies. The basis functions used are aperiodic in nature and converge. The basis functions include amplitude modulation in the representation. The Fourier–Bessel series expansion spectrum provides frequency points equal to the signal length.

Applications 

The Fourier–Bessel series expansion employs aperiodic and decaying Bessel functions as the basis. The Fourier–Bessel series expansion has been successfully applied in diversified areas such as Gear fault diagnosis, discrimination of odorants in a turbulent ambient, postural stability analysis, detection of voice onset time, glottal closure instants (epoch) detection, separation of speech formants, speech enhancement, and speaker identification. The Fourier–Bessel series expansion has also been used to reduce cross terms in the Wigner–Ville distribution.

Dini series

A second Fourier–Bessel series, also known as Dini series, is associated with the Robin boundary condition
 where  is an arbitrary constant.
The Dini series can be defined by

The coefficients  are given by

See also
Orthogonality
Generalized Fourier series
Hankel transform
Kapteyn series
Neumann polynomial
Schlömilch's series

References

External links
 
 
 Fourier–Bessel series applied to Acoustic Field analysis on Trinnov Audio's research page

Fourier series